During the Spanish Golden Age a great number of translations were made, specially from Arabic, Latin and Greek classics, into Spanish, and in turn, from Spanish into other languages.

Background
The Spanish Golden Age that expanded from the late 15th century to the 17th, witnessed the flourishing of cultural and artistic expressions. Many translation of works from Latin and Greek was published and spread out throughout the rest of the Europe. At the same time, the interest for ancient Arabic scientific and medical writings was still very prominent, in spite of the fact that a large part of the Muslim community who had refused to convert to Christianity, had been expelled from Spain along with similarly unconverted Jews during the year of 1492.

The legacy from the prestigious Toledo School of Translators, established during the 12th and 13th centuries, had diminished considerably after the expulsion of the Moors and Jews from Spain in 1492, but in many of the old Arab quarters of Spanish cities the tradition of translation from Arabic to Latin or Spanish continued, although frequently in disguise to avoid the suspicions of the Inquisition. A known Spanish translation of the Muslim Koran, was made in 1456, but however, after 1492 the situation of the Muslim community left in Spain changed drastically, when they were told to accept the Christian faith by means of baptism as a condition for remaining in Spain.

Translations into Spanish
Those Muslims and Jews who chose to stay in Spain while maintaining their religion had to carry out their non-Christian rituals in secret. Their religious books also had to be kept hidden, and for many years they would use Aljamiado manuscripts, which used the Arabic alphabet for transcribing Romance languages such as Mozarabic, Spanish or Ladino. Aljamiado played a very important role in preserving some of the Moriscos Islamic beliefs and traditions secretly. However, as the years passed they grew increasingly unable to read the original texts, and turned more and more to Spanish translations. Even though many of these translations were destroyed by the Inquisition, some have survived, and bear witness to the laborious task of translating and then copying the religious books by hand. In the year 1606, a Morisco copier of the Koran in Spain made this marginal notation in a mixture of Castilian, Aljamiado and Arabic:

Nonetheless the successive Catholic monarchs were very keen on education, and created many universities and study centers, where translations took place. Besides the study and translation of philosophical and scientific works from Arabic, Greek, Hebrew and other languages from Europe and the Mediterranean basin, translations were made from literature works and orally transmuted legends and traditions from native languages in the New World.

Translations from Spanish

The particular aspects of Spanish Humanism in the Renaissance did much to shape the Spanish attitude towards literary translation. In this period the English language acquired a great number of Spanish words. English lexicographers began to accumulate lists of Spanish words, beginning with John Thorius in 1590, and for the next two centuries this interest for the Spanish language facilitated translation into the two languages as well as the mutual borrowing of words.

In the New World, translations were made specially of those books deemed appropriate for the propagation of the Christian Doctrine in far away lands, predominantly in America and Asia.

Criticism
Most of the issues that arose from undertaking such enormous and varied amount of translations during this period are reflected in the Don Quijote de la Mancha of Miguel de Cervantes, where he attributes the authorship of his book to a variety of characters and translators, some with Moorish names, some Spanish, and some from other parts of Europe. Cervantes also expresses his opinion on the translation process, offering a rather despairing metaphor for the end result of translations, which is frequently cited by contemporary theoreticians and translating experts:

According to Cervantes, translations (with the exception of those made between Greek and Latin), are like looking at Flemish tapestry by its reverse side, where although the main figures can be discerned, they are obscured by the loose threads and lack the clarity of the front side.

See also
Spanish Golden Age
Toledo School of Translators
Latin translations of the 12th century

References
 Child, Jack. Introduction to Spanish Translation. Lanham: University Press of America, 1992.
 de la Cuesta, Leonel. Lecciones Preliminares de Traductología. Miami: Ediciones Guayacán, 1987.
 Nida, Eugene A. Language, Structure and Translation. Stanford: Stanford University Press,1975.

Notes

External links
 Robert of Ketton's Qu'ran, as edited by Bibliander —(1550 revised edition)
 El Quijote y la traducción—

•
Spanish Golden Age
.
Spanish language
.
.